W. H. Langley House is a historic home located near Elm City, Wilson County, North Carolina.  It was built about 1865 as a simple three-bay single-story dwelling with two exterior end chimneys. It was enlarged and remodelled in the Colonial Revival style in 1911.  It is a -story, five bay, frame dwelling with a steeply pitched gable roof and rear kitchen ell.  It features a complex wraparound porch, projecting pedimented pavilions, and Palladian windows on the gable ends.

It was listed on the National Register of Historic Places in 1986.

References

Houses on the National Register of Historic Places in North Carolina
Colonial Revival architecture in North Carolina
Houses completed in 1911
Houses in Wilson County, North Carolina
National Register of Historic Places in Wilson County, North Carolina